Operation Match was the first computer dating service in the United States, begun in 1965. The predecessor of this was created in London and was called St. James Computer Dating Service (later to become Com-Pat) started by Joan Ball in 1964. Users filled out a paper questionnaire that they mailed with a $3 fee. The questionnaire was geared to young college students seeking a date, not a marriage partner. Questions included "Do you believe in a God who answers prayer?" and "Is extensive sexual activity in preparation for marriage part of 'growing up?'" The questionnaires were transferred to punched cards and processed on an IBM 7090 computer at the Avco service bureau in Wilmington, Massachusetts. A week or two later, the user received an IBM 1401 print out in the mail listing the names and telephone numbers of their matches.

Operation Match was started by Harvard University undergraduate students Jeffrey C. Tarr, David L. Crump and Vaughan Morrill, with help from Douglas H. Ginsburg, then a student at Cornell University. Tarr, Crump and Ginsburg formed a company named Compatibility Research, Inc. and rolled out the service in several cities.

References

History of human–computer interaction
Online dating services of the United States
1965 establishments in the United States